Daisy Fay Buchanan is a fictional character in F. Scott Fitzgerald's 1925 novel The Great Gatsby. The character is a wealthy socialite from Louisville, Kentucky who resides in the fashionable town of East Egg on Long Island during the Jazz Age. She is narrator Nick Carraway's second cousin, once removed, and the wife of polo player Tom Buchanan, by whom she has a daughter. Before marrying Tom, Daisy had a romantic relationship with Jay Gatsby. Her choice between Gatsby and Tom is one of the novel's central conflicts. Described by Fitzgerald as a "golden girl", she is the target of both Tom's callous domination and Gatsby's dehumanizing adoration. The ensuing contest of wills between Tom and Gatsby reduces Daisy to a trophy wife whose sole existence is to augment her possessor's socio-economic success.

Fitzgerald based the fictional character on socialite Ginevra King. Fitzgerald and King shared a passionate romance from 1915 to 1917, but their relationship stagnated after King's father purportedly warned the writer that "poor boys shouldn't think of marrying rich girls". After their relationship ended, a distraught Fitzgerald dropped out of Princeton University and enlisted in the United States Army amid World War I, while King entered into an arranged marriage with William "Bill" Mitchell, a polo player who partly served as the model for Tom Buchanan. Following King's separation from Mitchell in 1937, Fitzgerald attempted to reunite with King when she visited Hollywood in 1938. The reunion proved a disaster due to Fitzgerald's alcoholism. Scholar Maureen Corrigan notes that "because she's the one who got away, Ginevra—even more than [his wife] Zelda—is the love who lodged like an irritant in Fitzgerald's imagination, producing the literary pearl that is Daisy Buchanan".

The character of Daisy Buchanan has been identified as personifying the cultural archetype of the flapper. Flappers were typically young, modern women who bobbed their hair and wore short skirts. They also drank alcohol and had premarital sex. Despite the newfound societal freedoms attained by flappers in the 1920s, Fitzgerald's novel examines the continued limitations upon women's agency during this period. In this context, although early critics viewed the character of Daisy to be a "monster of bitchery", later scholars assert that Daisy's character exemplifies the marginalization of women in the elite social milieu that Fitzgerald depicts.

The character has appeared in various media related to the novel, including stage plays, radio shows, television episodes, and feature films. New York actress Florence Eldridge originated the role of Daisy on the stage when she starred in the 1926 Broadway adaptation of Fitzgerald's novel at the Ambassador Theatre in New York City. That same year, screen actress Lois Wilson played the role in the now lost 1926 silent film adaptation. During the subsequent decades, the role has been played by many actresses including Betty Field, Phyllis Kirk, Jeanne Crain, Mia Farrow, Mira Sorvino, Pippa Bennett-Warner, Carey Mulligan, and others.

Character biography 

Daisy Fay was raised in luxury in Louisville, Kentucky during the Jim Crow period. In 1917, although she had several suitors belonging to her same privileged social class, she entered into a month-long relationship with impoverished doughboy Jay Gatsby which ended with them promising to marry each other in the future. While Gatsby served in World War I, Daisy married the extremely wealthy polo player Thomas "Tom" Buchanan. The couple moved to East Egg, an "old money" enclave on Long Island, where they resided in a cheerful red-and-white Georgian Colonial mansion overlooking Manhasset Bay.

After her cousin Nick Carraway arrived at the neighboring nouveau riche town of West Egg, he met Gatsby, who had become a millionaire. Gatsby had moved to Long Island in order to reunite with Daisy, and he threw extravagant soirées at his mansion, hoping she might attend. Nick arranged a tête-à-tête between Daisy and Jay at his cottage in West Egg. The two met for the first time in five years and began a sexual affair.

Later at the Buchanan residence, Daisy, Tom, and Gatsby—as well as her friends Nick and Jordan Baker—decided to visit the 20-story Plaza Hotel, a château-like edifice in New York City with an architectural style inspired by the French Renaissance. Tom embarked in Gatsby's yellow Rolls-Royce with Jordan and Nick, while Daisy and Gatsby drove alone in Tom's blue coupé. After the ensemble reached the hotel, a confrontation ensued between Tom and Gatsby regarding Daisy's infidelity. Though Gatsby insisted that Daisy never loved Tom, Daisy admitted that she loved both Tom and Gatsby. The confrontation ended with Daisy leaving with Gatsby in his yellow car, while Tom departed with Nick and Jordan.

Tom's mistress Myrtle Wilson previously had seen Tom driving Gatsby's yellow car in the "valley of ashes", a sprawling refuse dump. When she saw it approach that evening on its way back to East Egg, she presumed it was being driven by Tom and ran in front of it in hopes of reconciling with him. Daisy ran her over. Gatsby stopped the car by applying the emergency brake and then took over driving from Daisy, fleeing the scene of the accident.

At her home in East Egg, Gatsby assured Daisy that he would take the blame for Myrtle's death. Tom informed Myrtle's husband George Wilson that it was Gatsby who killed Myrtle. A distraught George traveled to Gatsby's mansion in West Egg and shot Gatsby dead before turning the weapon on himself. Soon after Gatsby's murder, Daisy, Tom, and their daughter departed East Egg, leaving no forwarding address.

Creation and conception 

Fitzgerald based the character of Daisy Buchanan on Chicago socialite and heiress Ginevra King, whom he met on a visit back home in St. Paul, Minnesota while enrolled as a student at Princeton University. The 18-year-old aspiring writer fell deeply in love with the 16-year-old King, and he wrote to her "daily the incoherent, expressive letters all young lovers write". In Fitzgerald's mind, Ginevra became the "archetype for the alluring, independent and upper-class woman, ultimately unattainable by someone of a modest social background like himself". After his later marriage to Zelda Sayre, Fitzgerald continued to view King as an unobtainable ideal who embodied the elusive American dream. According to acquaintances, "Fitzgerald was so smitten by King that for years he could not think of her without tears coming to his eyes".

During their relationship, Ginevra wrote a Gatsby-like short story that she sent to Fitzgerald. In her story, she is trapped in a loveless marriage with a wealthy man yet still pines for Fitzgerald, a former lover from her past. The lovers are reunited only after Fitzgerald has attained enough money to take her away from her adulterous husband. Fitzgerald kept Ginevra's story with him until his death, and scholars have noted the plot similarities between Ginevra's story and Fitzgerald's novel The Great Gatsby. King would greatly influence Fitzgerald's writing, far more so than his wife Zelda Sayre. Scholar Maureen Corrigan notes that "because she's the one who got away, Ginevra—even more than Zelda—is the love who lodged like an irritant in Fitzgerald's imagination, producing the literary pearl that is Daisy Buchanan".

In August 1916, Fitzgerald visited Ginevra at her family's villa in the upper-class enclave of Lake Forest, Illinois. At the time, Lake Forest "was off-limits to Black and Jewish people," and the recurrent appearance of a middle-class Irish Catholic parvenu such as Fitzgerald in the exclusively White Anglo-Saxon Protestant area would have caused a stir. A conspicuously out-of-place Fitzgerald was purportedly told by Ginevra's imperious father, stockbroker Charles Garfield King, that "poor boys shouldn't think of marrying rich girls". After their relationship ended in January 1917, a distraught Fitzgerald dropped out of Princeton University and enlisted in the United States Army amid World War I, while King abruptly entered into an arranged marriage with her first husband, William "Bill" Mitchell, an avid polo player who partly served as the model for Thomas "Tom" Buchanan in the same novel. Mitchell would become a director of Texaco, one of the most successful oil companies of the era.

King separated from Mitchell in 1937 after an unhappy marriage. One year later, Fitzgerald attempted to reunite with King when she visited Hollywood in 1938. The reunion proved a disaster due to Fitzgerald's alcoholism, and a disappointed King returned to Chicago. Her second husband, John T. Pirie Jr., was a business tycoon and owner of the Chicago department retailer Carson Pirie Scott & Company. Reflecting in her later years upon her romance with Fitzgerald, King remarked: "Goodness, what a self-centered little ass I was!" She died in 1980 at the age of 82 at her family's estate in Charleston, South Carolina.

To a lesser extent, Fitzgerald partially based Daisy on his wife Zelda. Writer Therese Anne Fowler has noted several similarities that both Daisy and Zelda shared: "the Southern upbringing, the prominent family." According to Zelda's biographer Nancy Milford, "if there was a Confederate establishment in the Deep South, Zelda Sayre came from the heart of it". Zelda Sayre was the granddaughter of Confederate Senator Willis B. Machen. Her father's uncle was John Tyler Morgan, a Confederate general in the American Civil War and the second Grand Dragon of the Ku Klux Klan in Alabama. In addition to their leadership of the Alabama Ku Klux Klan, Zelda's family owned the White House of the Confederacy.

During her idle youth, Zelda Sayre's wealthy Southern family employed half-a-dozen domestic servants, many of whom were African-American. Consequently, much like Daisy Buchanan, Zelda was unaccustomed to domestic labor or responsibilities of any kind. When their daughter Scottie was born, Fitzgerald recorded Zelda saying as she emerged from the anesthesia: "Oh, God...I'm drunk. Mark Twain. Isn't she smart—she has the hiccups. I hope it's beautiful and a fool—a beautiful little fool." Fitzgerald partly used this quotation for Daisy's dialogue in The Great Gatsby.

Critical analysis 

The character of Daisy Buchanan has been identified specifically as personifying the Jazz Age archetype of the flapper. Flappers were typically young, modern women who bobbed their hair and wore short skirts. They also drank alcohol and had premarital sex. Despite the newfound societal freedoms attained by flappers in the 1920s, Fitzgerald's work critically examines the continued limitations upon women's agency during this period. In this context, although early critics viewed the character of Daisy to be a "monster of bitchery", later scholars asserted that the character exemplifies the marginalization of women in the elite social milieu that Fitzgerald depicts.

In the 1940s and 1950s, many scholars and critics unequivocally condemned Daisy as an irredeemable villain. Critic Marius Bewley remarked upon the character's "vicious emptiness," Robert Ornstein dubbed her "criminally immoral," Alfred Kazin judged her to be "vulgar and inhuman," and Leslie Fiedler regarded her as a "dark destroyer" who purveys "corruption and death". In these earlier critiques, Gatsby was likened unto an innocent and Daisy equated with "foul dust [that] floated in the wake of his dreams".

Revisionist opinions about the character began to emerge over time in the 1960s and 1970s. Writing in 1978, scholar Leland S. Person noted Daisy is more of a hapless victim than a manipulative victimizer. Described by Fitzgerald as a "golden girl", she is the target first of Tom's callous domination and next of Gatsby's dehumanizing adoration. She involuntarily becomes the holy grail at the center of Gatsby's unrealistic quest to be steadfast to a youthful concept of himself. The ensuing contest of wills between Tom and Gatsby reduces Daisy to a trophy wife whose sole existence is to augment her possessor's socio-economic success.

As an upper-class white woman living in East Egg during this time period, Daisy must adhere to societal expectations and gender norms such as actively fulfilling the roles of dutiful wife, nurturing mother, and charming socialite. Many of Daisy's choices—ultimately culminating in the fatal car crash and misery for all those involved—can be partly attributed to her prescribed role as a "beautiful little fool" who is reliant on her husband for financial and societal security. Her decision to remain with her husband, despite her feelings for Gatsby, is because of the wealth and security that her marriage to Tom Buchanan provides.

Notwithstanding this scholarly reevaluation in academia, many contemporary readers continue to regard Daisy as an antagonist or an antiheroine. Often listed as among "the most discussed and polarizing female characters in American literature," readers frequently vilify Daisy for the consequences of her actions, such as directly and indirectly causing the deaths of several characters. Writer Ester Bloom has opined that Daisy is not technically the story's villain, but "she still sucks, and if it weren't for her, a couple of key players in the book would be alive at the end of it."

Despite such widespread antipathy, many readers have sympathized with the character. Writer Katie Baker observed that, although Daisy lives and Gatsby dies, "in the end, both Gatsby and Daisy have lost their youthful dreams, that sense of eternal possibility that made the summertimes sweet. And love her or hate her, there's something to pity in that irrevocable fact." Dave McGinn listed the character as one who needed their side of the story told. He questioned if she truly had a "voice full of money", as Gatsby claimed, and wondered what her thoughts were on the love triangle between her, Gatsby and Tom.

Daisy as a reference point 

Both Daisy Buchanan and her husband Tom often are invoked in popular discourse in the context of careless indifference by affluent persons. In July 2016, on the eve of the 2016 United States presidential election, New York Times columnist Maureen Dowd likened Hillary Clinton and Bill Clinton to Daisy and Tom Buchanan due to their perceived carelessness in the political arena. Dowd wrote: "And that's the corkscrew way things go with the Clintons, who are staying true to their reputation as the Tom and Daisy Buchanan of American politics. Their vast carelessness drags down everyone around them, but they persevere, and even thrive." Four years later, in October 2020, the response of Donald Trump's administration to the COVID-19 pandemic was compared by New York Times writer Ian Prasad Philbrick to the careless indifference of Daisy and Tom Buchanan. The "blasé Buchanans in the novel's final pages," Philbrick remarked, "seemed to fit an administration that has attempted to downplay the pandemic, even after Trump and other top Republicans tested positive for Covid-19."

Daisy has been cited as a role model for young women who aspire to attain wealth and to live life for the moment. "You should take Daisy's advice: be a 'fool'," urged writer Carlie Lindower of Mic.com, "Be a fool and covet only what is on the surface—the pearls, the furs, the immaculate lawn—because any deeper than that is murky territory filled with misguided ideals and broken pillars of feminism." Similarly, Inga Ting of The Sydney Morning Herald posited that Daisy's materialistic ambitions are both understandable and rationale as indicated by peer-reviewed academic studies. "Men want beauty," Ting opined, "women want money".

The character of Daisy Buchanan is also often referenced in popular culture in terms of Jazz Age and flapper aesthetics. In the wake of Baz Luhrmann's 2013 film which featured Daisy with a bob cut, certain versions of the hairstyle were retroactively associated with the character. Consequently, the character's physical description has become synonymous with 1920s glamour.

Portrayals

Stage 

The first actress to portray Daisy Buchanan in any medium was 24-year-old Florence Eldridge who starred in the 1926 Broadway adaptation of Fitzgerald's novel at the Ambassador Theatre in New York City. The play was directed by George Cukor. The production delighted audiences and garnered rave reviews from theater critics. The play ran for 112 performances and then paused when its lead actor James Rennie traveled to the United Kingdom to visit an ailing family member. As F. Scott Fitzgerald was vacationing in Europe at the time, he never saw the 1926 Broadway play, but his agent Harold Ober sent him telegrams which quoted the many positive reviews of the production. A year later, Elderidge married film actor Fredric March in 1927.

In the footsteps of Florence Eldridge, later actresses have portrayed Daisy Buchanan on the stage. Heidi Armbruster portrayed Daisy in Simon Levy's 2006 stage adaptation of Fitzgerald's novel. Armbruster's performance, according to critic Quinton Skinner, was "full of loony momentary enthusiasms and a dangerous sensuality, though by the second act, Armbruster's perf  veers toward hollow mannerisms." Daisy was portrayed by Monte McGrath in a 2012 version of the same play, and her performance was met with acclaim. Madeleine Herd played Daisy in a 2015 adaptation by Independent Theater productions.

Film 
A number of actresses have portrayed Daisy Buchanan in cinematic adaptations of Fitzgerald's novel. The first cinematic adaptation of The Great Gatsby was a silent film produced in 1926 and featured Lois Wilson as Daisy. In contrast to later adaptations, the film treatment and screenplay were both written by women. The treatment was by Elizabeth Meehan, and the screenplay was by Becky Gardiner. Reviewers praised Warner Baxter's portrayal of Gatsby and Neil Hamilton's portrayal of Nick Carraway but some found Lois Wilson's interpretation of Daisy to be needlessly unsympathetic. Other critics raved that Wilson reached "heights of emotional acting in the picture which she never before attained" and did "the best acting of her career." Reportedly, F. Scott Fitzgerald and his wife Zelda loathed the 1926 film adaptation of his novel and walked out midway through a viewing of the film at a theater. "We saw The Great Gatsby at the movies," Zelda later wrote to an acquaintance, "It's rotten and awful and terrible and we left." The film is considered lost.

In 1949, a second cinematic adaptation was undertaken starring Betty Field as Daisy. In contrast to the 1926 adaptation, the 1949 adaptation was filmed under the strictures of the Hollywood Production Code, and the novel's plot was altered to appease Production Code Administration censors. According to screenwriter Richard Maibaum, critics were conflicted about Field's performance as Daisy: "Some thought she was perfect, others that she was subtly wrong." Critic Lew Sheaffer wrote in The Brooklyn Daily Eagle that Field performed "the difficult feat of making a strong impact" as Gatsby's "vague, shilly-shallying sweetheart." Boyd Martin of The Courier-Journal opined that Field was "convincing in showing the shallowness of Daisy's character", whereas Wanda Hale of The New York Daily News complained that Field gave "such a restrained, delicate performance that you have to use some imagination to understand her weakness."

In 1974, Mia Farrow portrayed Daisy in the third cinematic adaptation. The film received poor critical reviews, and Farrow's performance as Daisy was met with a mixed reception. Bruce Handy of Vanity Fair praised Farrow as being "full of vain flutter and the seductive instant intimacy of the careless rich". Vincent Canby of The New York Times, in an otherwise negative review of the film, wrote favorably of Farrow as Daisy, calling the actress' performance "just odd enough to be right as Daisy, a woman who cannot conceive of the cruelties she so casually commits". Roger Ebert lamented that Farrow played Daisy as "all squeaks and narcissism and empty sophistication." Similarly, Gene Siskel complained that Farrow interpreted Daisy to be a "skittish child-woman" who bore little resemblance to Fitzgerald's character. Upon viewing the 1974 film, Fitzgerald's daughter Frances "Scottie" Fitzgerald criticized Farrow's performance as Daisy. Although she praised Farrow as a "fine actress," Scottie noted that Farrow seemed unable to convey the "Southern nature" of Daisy's character.

In 2013, Carey Mulligan portrayed Daisy in the fourth cinematic adaptation. Mulligan had two 90-minute auditions, which she found to be fun and served as her initial encounters with Leonardo DiCaprio, who portrayed Gatsby. Mulligan partly based her performance on the Kardashian family in regards to "looking very present, presentational, and perfect." She was familiar with the dislike some readers of The Great Gatsby had for the character but felt she could not "think that about her, because I can't play her thinking she's awful." Todd McCarthy of The Hollywood Reporter in his review of the 2013 film wrote that viewers had their own ideas about Daisy's character and would debate whether Mulligan "has the beauty, the bearing, the dream qualities desired for the part, but she lucidly portrays the desperate tear Daisy feels between her unquestionable love for Gatsby and fear of her husband." Critic Jonathan Romney of The Independent praised Mulligan's "reassuringly candid presence" which he described as "weary, wan, with a dash of Blanche DuBois."

Television 
Phyllis Kirk portrayed Daisy in a 1955 episode of the television series Robert Montgomery Presents adapting The Great Gatsby. Reviewers were lukewarm towards Kirk's interpretation of Daisy noting that her performance was "fine" and more than adequate as "the distraught lady across the bay" from Gatsby. Three years later, Jeanne Crain played Daisy in a 1958 episode of the television series Playhouse 90. Mira Sorvino played Daisy in the 2000 television adaptation. Produced on a limited budget, the 2000 television adaptation greatly suffered from low production values. Sorvino's performance was roundly criticized. Natasha Joffe of The Guardian wrote that Sorvino was an abysmal Daisy "whose voice is supposed to be full of money, but is just moany. Why would Gatsby love her? She looks like a drowned goose and her hats are like they've been made out of old pants." Similarly, John Crook of The Fremont Tribune wrote that Sorvino was "seriously miscast as Daisy". In 2007, Tricia Paoluccio portrayed Daisy in an American Masters television episode titled "Novel Reflections: The American Dream".

Radio 
Irene Dunne starred as Daisy in an adaptation broadcast on Family Hour of Stars on January 1, 1950, and Pippa Bennett-Warner played Daisy in the 2012 two-part Classic Serial production.

List

See also 
 Adaptations and portrayals of F. Scott Fitzgerald

References

Citations

Works cited 

 
 
 
 
 
 
 
 
 
 
 
 
 
 
 
 
 
 
 
 
 
 
 
 
 
 
 
 
 
 
 
 
 
 
 
 
 
 
 
 
 
 
 
 
 
 
 
 
 
 
 
 
 
 
 
 
 
 
 
 
 
 
 
 
 
 
 
 
 
 
 
 
 
 
 
 
 
 
 

Characters in American novels of the 20th century
Drama film characters
Female characters in film
Female characters in literature
Fictional characters based on real people
Fictional characters from Kentucky
Fictional characters from New York (state)
Fictional socialites
Literary characters introduced in 1925
Flappers
The Great Gatsby